Christmas in Vienna is a 1993 album released by American soul singer Diana Ross, and Spanish tenors Plácido Domingo and José Carreras for the Sony Classical label. The concert that formed the basis of this album was Domingo's first in his series of televised Christmas in Vienna concerts.

The album was recorded on December 23, 1992, at the Rathaus in Vienna with the Vienna Symphony Orchestra and the Gumpoldskirch Boys Choir as ensemble.
It charted in both the US and UK and was very successful on the Billboard Classical albums chart, reaching #2 and remaining on the chart for 31 weeks. Internationally it reached Gold status in Germany and Switzerland, while going Platinum in Austria and Spain and Multi Platinum in the Netherlands and Norway. The album sold over 1 million copies and was an example how pop singers and classical singers can sing together.
The video recording of the event aired on PBS stations as part of Great Performances the following Christmas season in the USA.

Track listing

Audio CD
"Jingle Bells" (Pierpont) - 1:37
"Mille Cherubini in Coro" (Schubert) - 3:54
"Amazing Grace" (Newton) - 5:46
"Wiegenlied" (Brahms) - 2:57
"Carol of the Drum (Little Drummer Boy)" (Davis) - 2:58
"The Gift of Love"  (Domingo Jr, Reilly) Orchestration by Juan J. Colomer - 3:57
"Navidad" (Fons, Montalban) - 4:05
"White Christmas" (Berlin) - 2:44
"Ave Maria" (Schubert) - 4:56
"Ave Maria" (Mascagni, from Cavalleria rusticana) - 3:38
"It's the Most Wonderful Time of the Year" (Pola, Wyle) - 2:42
"Adeste Fideles" (Oakeley, Wade) - 2:42
"If We Hold on Together" (Horner, Mann, Jennings) - 3:31
"O Tannenbaum"/"Minuit, Chrétiens"/"Jingle Bells"/"La Virgen Lava Pañales"/"O Little Town of Bethlehem"/"Tu Scendi Dalle Stelle"/"Joy to the World" (Traditional/Adolphe-Charles Adam/Henry Walford Davies/Lowell Mason) - 13:45
"Stille Nacht" (Gruber, Mohr) - 3:54

DVD
"Jingle Bells" (James S. Pierpont) - 1:37
"Mille Cherubini In Coro" (Alois Melichar) - 3:54
"Songs (5), Op. 49: no 4, Wiegenlied" (Johannes Brahms) - 2:57
"The Little Drummer Boy (Carol of the Drum)" (Katherine K. Davis) - 2:58
"Navidad" (Antoni Parera Fons) - 4:05
"Holiday Inn: White Christmas" (Irving Berlin) - 2:41
"Ellens Gesang III, D 839/Op. 52 no 6 'Ave Maria'" (Franz Schubert) - 4:58
"Cavalleria Rusticana: Intermezzo" (Pietro Mascagni) - 3:41
"It's the Most Wonderful Time of the Year" (Eddie Pola) - 2:42
"Adeste Fideles 'O Come, All Ye Faithful'" (John Francis Wade) - 2:40
"If We Hold on Together" (James Horner, Barry Mann, Will Jennings) - 3:31
"O Tannenbaum"/"Minuit, Chrétiens"/"Jingle Bells"/"La Virgen Lava Pañales"/"O Little Town of Bethlehem"/"Tu Scendi Dalle Stelle"/"Joy to the World" (Traditional/Adolphe-Charles Adam/Henry Walford Davies/Lowell Mason) - 13:45
"Silent Night" (Franz Xaver Gruber) - 3:54
"The Gift of Love" (Plácido Domingo Jr.) Orchestration by Juan Colomer 3:55
"Amazing Grace" (John Newton) - 5:46

Charts

Certifications and sales

See also
 Christmas in Vienna II
 Christmas in Vienna III
 Christmas in Vienna VI

References

External links
 Christmas in Vienna Sony Classical
Detailed playlist at Arvik Music

1993 Christmas albums
1993 live albums
1993 classical albums
Live Christmas albums
Plácido Domingo albums
2007 live albums
2007 video albums
Live video albums
Motown live albums
Motown video albums
Diana Ross live albums
Diana Ross video albums
Christmas albums by Spanish artists
Christmas albums by American artists